Róise & Frank is a 2022 Irish comedy drama directed and written by Rachael Moriarty & Peter Murphy. It is set in Ring, a town within Gaeltacht na nDéise in Waterford.

Plot 
Two years after the death of her husband Frank, Róise becomes increasingly isolated from those around her, going through the motions of her life. An unchipped, apparently ownerless, dog appears at Róise's doorstep & is insistent on staying with Róise. The dog manages to reawaken Róise and ends up reconnecting her to her family & community.

Róise becomes very attached to the mysterious dog, who seemingly possesses traits of her late husband Frank. Róise, believing the dog to be her husbands reincarnation begins calling the dog, "Frank". Róise's son, Alan, becomes frightened of his mothers obsession with "Frank", worried that his mother is losing her mental faculties from the continued absence of his father. However, the greater community is sympathetic with Róise's belief & humors her until they too, connect the behaviors of the dog to her late husband. 

Donncha, the next-door neighbor, acts antagonistic to "Frank" after Róise does not allow his advances. He drugs the dog & has him sent to the pound, asserting that the dog is violent & dangerous. However, the vet at the pound investigates "Frank" and finds him to be of cool temper. He allows "Frank" to be adopted by another family, now being named "Sparky" by his new owners. Róise, Alan & Maidhcí investigate & find "Frank" with the help of the vet, seeing the dog help another family cope with the loss of a loved one. Róise decides to adopt a new dog & continue her life without "Frank".

Cast 

 Bríd Ní Neachtain as Róise
 Cillian Ó Gairbhí as Alan
 Lorcan Cranitch as Donncha
 Ruadhán de Faoite as Maidhcí
 Barley, a canine actor, as Frank

Production 
Róise & Frank was filmed during the summer of 2019 and is filmed & set in the coastal Gaeltacht of An Rinn. Produced by Dublin-based television and film production company Macalla Teoranta. The film was funded & supported by TG4, Screen Ireland and the Broadcasting Authority of Ireland (BAI), specifically the film was awarded €1.2million funding through the Cine4 scheme in May 2018.

In 2019, Mo Ghrá Buan, (my eternal love) was the working title.

Release 
Dog Friendly Release
US wide-release

Accolades

References

External links

Irish comedy-drama films